The 1989 Brabantse Pijl was the 29th edition of the Brabantse Pijl cycle race and was held on 26 March 1989. The race started in Sint-Genesius-Rode and finished in Alsemberg. The race was won by Johan Capiot.

General classification

References

1989
Brabantse Pijl